Most visitors to Gabon must obtain a visa in advance, either from one of the Gabonese diplomatic missions or online.

Visa policy map

Visa policy 
CItizens of the following 11 countries do not require a visa to enter Gabon for visits up to 90 days (unless otherwise noted):

Holders of diplomatic, official or service passports issued to nationals of Benin, Brazil, Burkina Faso, China, Cote d'Ivoire, Cuba, Djibouti, Egypt, France, Guinea, Israel, Mali, Russia, Senegal, South Korea and only diplomatic passports of Germany and Turkey do not require a visa for Gabon.

Visa on arrival
Citizens of the following countries can visit Gabon by obtaining a visa on arrival for 90 days:

Also all holders of an entry authorisation issued by Immigration prior to arrival, can obtain a visa on arrival.

E-Visa
Gabon announced the introduction of electronic visas for visitors in January 2015.

The e-Visa was introduced from 15 June 2015, and this e-visa system is usable by citizens of any country which requires a visa to visit Gabon. The visa is issued 72 hours after the application and is valid only for those arriving via Leon Mba International Airport in Libreville.

Transit without a visa 
Transit without a visa is possible for travellers continuing their trip to a third country by the same or first connecting plane within 24 hours or by the same plane if they are the citizens of the following countries: Albania, Armenia, Azerbaijan, Belarus, Bulgaria, People's Republic of China, Czech Republic, Georgia, Hungary, Kazakhstan, Democratic People's Republic of Korea (North Korea), Kyrgyzstan, Moldova, Mongolia, Montenegro, Poland, Romania, Russia, Serbia, Slovakia, Tajikistan, Turkmenistan, Ukraine, Uzbekistan and Vietnam. Not allowed for the citizens of Lebanon.

See also

Visa requirements for Gabonese citizens

References

External links
Gabon e-Visa

Gabon
Foreign relations of Gabon